Alfred K. Mann (September 4, 1920 – January 13, 2013) was a particle physicist, known for his role in the discovery of fundamental properties of neutrinos.

Education and career
Born in New York, Mann earned all three of his degrees from the University of Virginia: BA in philosophy in 1942, MS in physics in 1946, and PhD in physics in 1947. During WW II, he participated in the Manhattan Project. 

After working for a time at Columbia University he moved to the University of Pennsylvania in 1949. where he worked on the fundamental properties of neutrinos. He was an Guggenheim Fellow for the academic year 1981–1982. From his obituary in The Philadelphia Inquirer:

Selected publications

References

1920 births
2013 deaths
21st-century American physicists
Particle physicists
University of Virginia alumni
University of Pennsylvania faculty
Manhattan Project people
20th-century American physicists
Fellows of the American Physical Society
Columbia University faculty